Gail A. Bishop is an American professor of microbiology and immunology at the University of Iowa and director of the Center for Immunology & Immune-Based Diseases at the Carver College of Medicine.

Early life and education 
Bishop was born in Wisconsin, United States. She became interested in science as a teenager after first studying biology in the 9th grade. She completed a summer job in a leukemia research laboratory in Milwaukee. Bishop studied biology at St. Olaf College. She earned a master's degree in oncology at the University of Wisconsin–Madison. Bishop moved to University of Michigan as a graduate student, working in cellular biology with Joseph Glorioso. Her doctoral degree involved research into the Herpes simplex virus. After completing her PhD Bishop was appointed as a postdoctoral fellow to the University of North Carolina at Chapel Hill where she worked on the mechanism of B lymphocyte activation and the structure-function relationships within B cell signalling receptors.

Research and career 
In 1989 Bishop was appointed as an assistant professor at the University of Iowa. She was promoted to professor in 1998, and in 2001 became the Distinguished Professor of Microbiology.

Bishop studies the molecular mechanisms that underlie lymphocyte regulation and activation by members of the TNF receptor superfamily. She studies lymphocyte signalling and the interaction between immune receptors. Her work involves studying the mechanisms by which the protein-coding gene TRAF3 deficiency regulates survival in B lymphocytes. She has shown that TRAF3 is a regulator of critical negative regulator of homeostatic survival in B lymphocytes. Through this research Bishop hopes to design new treatments for B lymphocyte malignancies.

She has also investigated the role of TRAF3 in T cell signalling and function, as well as trying to establish the nuclear roles of TRAF3. T cells that are deficient in TRAF3 have no clear differences in survival, but do have decreases in CD4+ and CD8+ responses to infection or immunisation. Bishop showed that in T cells TRAF3 associates with the T-cell receptor (TCR) complex, which governs TCR-mediated activation.

Bishop believes that B lymphocytes could be used for immunotherapeutic cancer treatment, whereby B-cells can injected, become activated in vitro and serve as antigen-presenting cells. B cell immunotherapy presents a promising alternative to using dendritic cells.

Alongside her scientific research, Bishop has spoken about the environment for women and other minoritized groups within academic science.

Awards and honours 
Her awards and honours include:

 2003 University of Iowa Graduate Mentoring Award
 2007 Elected to the Council of the American Association of Immunologists
 2009 Iowa Technology Association Woman of Innovation
 2010 Chair of the National Institutes of Health Tumors, Tolerance and Transplantation study section
 2012 President of the American Association of Immunologists
 2019 Elected fellow of the American Association for the Advancement of Science

Selected publications 
Her publications include:

References 

Living people
Scientists from Wisconsin
St. Olaf College alumni
University of Wisconsin School of Medicine and Public Health alumni
University of Michigan alumni
American immunologists
University of North Carolina at Chapel Hill fellows
University of Iowa faculty
Cancer researchers
Women medical researchers
Women immunologists
American medical researchers
Fellows of the American Association for the Advancement of Science
Year of birth missing (living people)